"Cartman's Incredible Gift" is episode 124 of the Comedy Central series South Park. It originally aired December 8, 2004 as part of the series' eighth season. In the episode, local police become convinced that Eric Cartman has psychic abilities, which Cartman exploits for personal gain, much to the ire of Kyle Broflovski, other psychic detectives, and the true serial killer behind a series of murders that Cartman falsely attributes to others.

The episode's story continues South Park's critical view of psychics, previously seen in the episode "The Biggest Douche in the Universe", while also acting as a parody of several films, including Red Dragon, The Gift, and The Dead Zone.

Though a minor part of the episode, it marks the last appearance of the seldom-seen South Park Elementary school bus driver Mrs. Veronica Crabtree.

Plot
Cartman attempts to fly by jumping off of his roof with cardboard wings attached to his arms, to which only Kyle roots for knowing what's going to happen while everyone else is against it. He emerges from a brief coma in the hospital, where he shares a room with a victim of a serial killer who cuts off his victims' left hands. When Cartman makes a lucky guess and manages to deduce some obvious routine things, like the food the hospital is serving, a gullible local police detective, Sergeant Yates, believes that Cartman has developed psychic powers. Cartman plays along and is taken to the scene of one of the murders. Where Yates asks him if he is "seeing anything" Cartman closes his eyes and vocalizes his cravings for ice cream and Oreo cookies, prompting Yates to arrest ice cream shop owner Tom Johannsen with extreme brutality. Cartman receives a cash reward.

At school, Kyle angrily confronts Cartman over his fraudulent psychic abilities, but Cartman defiantly insists that he has such powers, and convinces the other frightened school children of this, though not Kyle, Stan, and Kenny. The left-hand murders resume, but instead of realizing his mistake, Yates rationalizes that these are copycat killings. At the next crime scene, the boys meet a disturbed man named Michael Deets who is quite obviously the murderer, but Yates refuses to listen to Kyle's pleas, focusing instead on Cartman's fake visions.

Cartman's involvement in the case makes him famous, resulting in a visit from a group of "psychic detectives" who demand he join their group and pay a fee. Cartman laughs off their pretensions, resulting in a "psychic battle" in which the "detectives" indulge in the same histrionics as Cartman, terrifying his mother. Failing to intimidate Cartman, the psychics leave with a threat of class action lawsuit. Cartman solves this problem by telling Sergeant Yates that the group is behind the copycat murders, leading the members of the group to be arrested, beaten, and in one case, fatally shot.

Meanwhile, Kyle has followed Deets to his home and obtained fingerprint and blood samples and had them analyzed, but he is completely ignored by the police. Deciding the police will listen to him only if he himself claims psychic powers, Kyle imitates Cartman's attempted flight and is rendered comatose. When he awakens he claims to have psychic powers and gives the police his original findings. Yates is skeptical but goes to investigate Deets anyway, who, by this point, has abducted Cartman, furious that the self-proclaimed psychic has credited his work to others.

When Yates arrives, he prepares to arrest Deets upon finding many severed hands pinned to a wall in Deets' home, but stands down upon realizing that the hands on the wall appear to be right hands, not left hands, because the thumb on Yates' own left hand points to the left, cluelessly failing to realize that he is looking at his hand with its palm facing up, in the opposite orientation of those on the wall. Yates leaves, not knowing that Cartman is bound and gagged in Deets' basement, but he questions his own observation about the hands. He goes back to the station, and after a montage depicting running elaborate criminology tests, exercising, and even losing track of what he was doing, he figures out his mistake, and returns to Deets' house, where he shoots Deets just before Deets can kill Cartman who begs Deets not kill him and confesses his sins to him.

At the hospital, Johannsen and the psychics have been released from prison, and Kyle is praised as a real psychic. Kyle, however, tells them that there are no psychics, and that there is a logical explanation for every psychic story ever heard. The other "psychics", however, decide to reignite their conflict with Cartman, and engage in a "final battle". Kyle becomes annoyed and loudly yells at them to stop, at which point the light bulbs in the room explode and a shelf becomes partially detached from its wall, spilling its contents on the floor. Everyone is surprised by this, but Kyle sheepishly insists there is a logical explanation for this.

Critical reception
In its review of the Season 8 DVD, Quigles of JoBlo.com expressed a positive opinion of the episode, in contrast to its perceived reception by others, stating that he/she "laughed pretty much non-stop during it", and calling the references to Red Dragon and The Dead Zone "hilarious".

Bill Gibron of DVD Talk thought the episode "kind of corny", stating that "Instead of being a blistering lampoon of The Dead Zone, it sort of falters, looking for an overall purpose".

Jesse Hicks, reviewing the episode for PopMatters, called it a "solid" one, despite series co-creator Trey Parker's reference to this season as "the year from hell", due to the grueling work schedule created by producing both the season and the feature film Team America: World Police.

Jonathan Barkan of Bloody Disgusting singled out as the best line of the episode Sergeant Yates' observation to Deets: "I see you like cutting the eyes out of photos with women. My son is a big fan of that too."

See also
Franz Reichelt, a French inventor who died after jumping from the Eiffel Tower using a wing-like parachute

References

External links
 "Cartman's Incredible Gift" Full episode at South Park Studios
 

Television episodes about abduction
Television episodes about psychic powers
Television episodes about serial killers
South Park (season 8) episodes